Heidi is a work of children's fiction published between 1880 and 1881 by Swiss author Johanna Spyri, originally published in two parts as Heidi: Her Years of Wandering and Learning and Heidi: How She Used What She Learned.
It is a novel about the events in the life of a 5-year-old girl in her paternal grandfather's care in the Swiss Alps. It was written as a book "for children and those who love children" (as quoted from its subtitle).

Heidi is one of the best-selling books ever written and is among the best-known works of Swiss literature.

Plot

In the town of Dörfli ('small village' in Swiss German), lived two brothers. The older wasted the family fortune on drinking and gambling, while the younger ran away to serve in the Italian Army in Naples. Upon his return with a son, Tobias, the villagers ostracize him and create rumors surrounding his life in Naples. The man becomes known as The Alm-Uncle, as he lives in seclusion on the mountain Alm. Two village girls, Dete and Adelheid, befriend Tobias. When they grow, Dete takes a job in the town of Maienfeld, in the Grisons, as a hotel maid. Adelheid and Tobias marry and work as carpenters. They have a daughter, named Adelheid but affectionately nicknamed Heidi. Soon after Tobias is killed in a work accident and Adelheid dies of shock. The Alm-Uncle holds this against God. 

Heidi is initially raised by her maternal grandmother and Dete in Maienfeld. Shortly after the grandmother's death, Dete is offered a good job as a maid in the big city, and takes 5-year-old Heidi to her paternal grandfather's house, up the mountain from Dörfli. He has been at odds with the villagers and embittered against God for years and lives in seclusion on the Alm, which has earned him the nickname 'The Alm-Uncle'. He briefly resents Heidi's arrival, but the girl's evident intelligence and cheerful yet unaffected demeanour soon earn his genuine, if reserved, love. Heidi enthusiastically befriends her new neighbours, young Peter the goatherd, his mother Brigitte, and his blind maternal grandmother. With each season that passes, the mountaintop inhabitants, especially Peter and the grandmother, grow more attached to Heidi, and she to them. However, the grandfather refuses to allow Heidi to attend school, and quarrels with the local pastor and schoolmaster, who try to encourage him to do so, and Heidi is illiterate as a result.

Three years later, Dete returns to take Heidi to Frankfurt to be a hired lady's companion to a wealthy girl named Klara Sesemann, who is unable to walk and regarded as an invalid. Klara is charmed by Heidi's simple friendliness and her descriptions of life on the Alm, and delights in all the funny mishaps brought about by Heidi's naïvety and lack of experience with city life. However, the Sesemanns' strict housekeeper, Fräulein Rottenmeier, views the household disruptions as wanton misbehaviour, and places the free-spirited Heidi under more and more restraint, forbidding her to talk of the Alps or to cry for home. Soon, Heidi becomes terribly homesick for the Alm, and grows alarmingly pale and thin. Her one diversion is learning to read and write using a collection of Biblical stories, motivated by Klara's grandmother Frau Sesemann who shows her trust and affection, and encourages her to believe in God and to pray. Later Frau Sesemann gifts Heidi the book.

Heidi's intractable homesickness leads to episodes of sleepwalking where she goes downstairs and opens the front door, which the household initially takes as the work of ghosts, and the family doctor recommends she be sent home as a matter of urgency before she becomes seriously ill. She returns to the mountains laden with presents for her friends and the book from Frau Sesemann, but finds one of her greatest pleasures is reading hymns to Peter's blind grandmother, who can no longer do so for herself. Her faith in God speaks to something in the Alm-Uncle. One day Heidi reads to him "The Prodigal Son" from a book Frau Sesemann gave her. That night Alm-Uncle prays for the first time in years. He accompanies Heidi to church, and that winter takes accommodation in the village so that she can attend school.

Heidi and Klara continue to keep in touch and exchange letters. A visit by the doctor to Heidi leads him to eagerly recommend that Klara visit Heidi, feeling assured that the mountain environment and the wholesome companionship will do her good. Klara makes the journey the next season and spends a wonderful summer with Heidi, becoming stronger on goat's milk and fresh mountain air. But Peter, who grows jealous of Heidi's and Klara's friendship, pushes her empty wheelchair down the mountain to its destruction, although he is soon wracked with guilt about what he did and ultimately confesses to it. Without her wheelchair, Klara has no choice but to learn to walk; she attempts to do so and is gradually successful. She is not very strong, often relying on Heidi or the grandfather to stay standing and not collapse, but it marks an end to her time as a lonely, shut-in invalid. Her grandmother and father are amazed and overcome with joy to see Klara walking again. The Sesemann family promises to provide permanent care for Heidi, if there ever comes a time when her grandfather is no longer able to do so.

Characters
Heidi: A joyful and free-spirited young girl who is orphaned as a toddler. At the beginning of the story, she is five years old. Heidi loves her grandfather and the beauty and fresh air of the mountains. Only Fräulein Rottenmeier calles her by her given name "Adelheid", in some translations "Adelaide".
Grandfather: Heidi's paternal grandfather, a cantankerous loner who lives in a hut high in the mountains. By other people than Heidi called in some translations "Uncle Alp".
Adelheid: Heidi's mother. She died from fever soon after her husband Tobias died. Spelled "Adelaide" in some translations.
Tobias: Heidi's father who was killed by a beam falling on his head when Heidi was a baby.
Dete: Heidi's selfish and insensitive aunt, the sister of Heidi's mother. Heidi lived with her after her parents had died. Dete is related to Grandfather (her and her sister Adelheid's great grandmother and Grandfather's grandmother were sisters). Spelled "Deta" or "Detie" in some translations.
Peter: A goat herder who lives with his mother and grandmother in a hut up the mountain located between the village Dörfli and the hut where Heidi's grandfather lives. He is eleven years old at the beginning of the story.
Brigitte: Peter's mother. Spelled "Brigitta" or "Bridget" in some translations.
Grannie: Peter's blind grandmother. Heidi gets very attached to her.
Klara Sesemann: A frail girl who cannot walk. Her mother died when she was young. Her father is often away on business trips. She lives in a big household with servants in Frankfurt and is twelve years old when the 8-year-old Heidi comes living with her. Spelled "Clara" in some translations.
Herr Sesemann: Klara's father, a successful businessman who travels often. In some translations "Mr Sesemann".
Frau Sesemann: By Klara and Heidi called "Grandmamma". Herr Sesemann's mother and Klara's grandmother. She is a kind woman and successfully encourages Heidi to learn reading. In some translations "Mrs Sesemann".
Doctor Classen: Friend of Herr Sesemann.
Fräulein Rottenmeier: The strict and arrogant housekeeper at Herr Sesemann's home who antagonizes Heidi. In some translations "Miss Rottenmeier".
Sebastian: A manservant in the Sesemann household.
Tinette: A maidservant in the Sesemann household.

Translations
English: Thirteen English translations were done between 1882 and 1959, by British and American translators: Louise Brooks, Helen B. Dole, H.A. Melcon, Helene S. White, Marian Edwardes, Elisabeth P. Stork, Mabel Abbott, Philip Schuyler Allen, Shirley Watkins, M. Rosenbaum, Eileen Hall, and Joy Law. As of 2010, only the Brooks, Edwardes and Hall translations are still in print.

Adaptations

Film and television

About 25 film or television productions of the original story have been made. The Heidi films were popular far and wide, becoming a huge hit, and the Japanese animated series became iconic in several countries around the world. The only incarnation of the Japanese-produced animated TV series to reach the English language was a dubbed feature-length compilation movie using the most pivotal episodes of the television series, released on video in the United States in 1985. Although the original book describes Heidi as having dark, curly hair, she is usually portrayed as blonde.

Versions of the story include:
Heidi, a 1937 motion picture which starred Shirley Temple in the title role.
Heidi, a 1952 film in Swiss German and German, directed by Luigi Comencini, starring Elsbeth Sigmund (filmed on location in Switzerland), and followed by a sequel, Heidi and Peter, in 1955, directed by Franz Schnyder, also starring Ms. Sigmund.

, a 1958 Indian Hindi-language family drama film adaptation by A. R. Kardar, starring Baby Naaz in the role of Poornima (Heidi).

Heidi, a six-part 1959 BBC TV series starring Sara O'Connor in the title role, with Mark Dignam as her grandfather and Lesley Judd as Klara.
Heidi, a 1965 Austrian film, directed by Werner Jacobs.
Heidi, a 1968 television film which starred Jennifer Edwards with Maximilian Schell and Michael Redgrave. This was the version that became infamous for interrupting an American football game that was broadcast the same day (November 17) on NBC. The game between the Oakland Raiders and the New York Jets was cut off a few minutes before the end of the game when it looked as if the Jets were going to win. However, after the cutoff, the Raiders made a comeback and beat the Jets with TV viewers on the east coast missing the conclusion. TV channels displayed the final score (Oakland winning 43–32) during the film, further enraging football fans. This incident led to a policy of not ending coverage of football games until after their conclusion. The game has gone down in professional football lore as "The Heidi Game" or "Heidi Bowl".

Heidi, Girl of the Alps, a 1974 Japanese anime series directed by Isao Takahata for Zuiyo Eizo (later, Nippon Animation), dubbed into various languages. Compiled into an English-dubbed movie entitled The Story of Heidi.

Heidi, a 1978 26-episode Swiss/German television series, starring Katia Polletin as the protagonist, which was dubbed into various languages, including English.
The New Adventures of Heidi (1978), directed by Ralph Senensky.
Heidi's Song (1982), American animated musical film produced by Hannah-Barbera.

Courage Mountain, a 1990 American adventure drama film and serves as a sequel to Johanna Spyri's novel Heidi, directed by Christopher Leitch.
Heidi, a two-part American television miniseries from 1993, starring Noley Thornton as Heidi. Co-stars included Jane Seymour as Miss Rottenmeier, Jason Robards as Grandfather and Lexi Randall as Klara.
Heidi, a 1995 animated film.
Heidi, a 2005 animated film.
Heidi, a 2005 British live-action film directed by Paul Marcus, starring Irish child actress Emma Bolger in the title role, alongside Max Von Sydow and Diana Rigg.
Heidi, a 2007 Swiss-French-Spanish-Czech television series set in modern times. starring Élodie Bollée as a teenage Heidi.
Heidi 4 Paws, a comedic 2008 adaptation featuring talking dogs with the voice of Angela Lansbury.
Heidi, a CGI remake of the 1974 anime series developed in 2015, made by Studio 100 Animation, the same makers of Maya the Bee.
Heidi, a 2015 Swiss live-action film directed by Alain Gsponer.
, a 2017 telenovela from Argentina.

Theatre

A stage musical adaptation of Heidi with book and lyrics by Francois Toerien, music by Mynie Grové and additional lyrics by Esther von Waltsleben, premiered in South Africa at the Klein Karoo National Arts Festival in 2016. Directed by Toerien with musical direction by Dawid Boverhoff, the production starred Tobie Cronjé (Rottenmeier), Dawid Minnaar (Sesemann), Albert Maritz (Grandfather), Ilse Klink (Aunt Dete), Karli Heine (Heidi), Lynelle Kenned (Klara), Dean Balie (Peter), Jill Middlekop and Marlo Minnaar. Puppets for the production were created by Hansie Visagie.

A stage musical adaptation of Heidi of the Mountain (music and lyrics by Claude Watt, book by Claude and Margaret Watt) was performed in Sidney, BC, Canada by Mountain Dream Productions, premiering in 2007 at the Charlie White Theatre, and has been performed again several times since then. The 2007 production starred Claude Watt (Grandfather), Margaret Watt (Rottenmeier), Rianne Craig (Heidi) and Katrina Brindle (Klara).

Computer games
There have been two Heidi computer games released for mobile devices, with the most recent being Heidi: Mountain Adventures. Both games are based on the Studio 100 TV series of 2015 and are aimed at young children, with educational elements and a series of mini-games.

Heidiland

Heidiland, named after the Heidi books, is an important tourist area in Switzerland, popular especially with Japanese and Korean tourists. Maienfeld is the center of what is called Heidiland; one of the villages, formerly called Oberrofels, is actually renamed "Heididorf". Heidiland is located in an area called Bündner Herrschaft; it is criticized as being a "laughable, infantile cliché" and "a more vivid example of hyperreality."

Sequels

Literary 
Between 1933 and 1955, French publishing company Flammarion published a new edition of Heidi along with a series of new original sequels. Despite being all published under Johanna Spyri's name, this books were neither written nor endorsed by Spyri, but were adapted from her other works by her French translator, Charles Tritten in the 1930s and 1940s, many years after she died, while the last one was witten by Nathalie Gala. The series is composed of a total of 7 books, 2 translated from Spyris' works and 5 original. Only two of them were published in English.

 Heidi. La merveilleuse histoire d'une fille de la montagne (1933), translation of the first Heidi volume (Heidis Lehr- und Wanderjahre).
 Heidi grandit (1934), translation of the second Heidi volume (Heidi kann brauchen, was es gelernt hat) with the addition of an original ending by Charles Tritten, which announces Heidi's further adventures.
 Heidi Grows Up (Heidi jeune fille, 1936) by Charles Tritten. It follows Heidi's teenage years.
 Au pays de Heidi (1938) by Charles Tritten. A perspective of Heidi's village seen by some of its inhabitants.
 Heidi's Children (Heidi et ses enfants, 1939) by Charles Tritten. About Heidi's adulthood with Peter and their children.
 Heidi grand’mère (1941) by Charles Tritten. About Heidi's later years with her grandchildren.
 Le sourire de Heidi (1955) by Nathalie Gala. A new story set once again during Heidi's younger years.

There are some major differences between the original Heidi and the Tritten sequels. These include;

 Heidi, the original story by Spyri, shows the simple life of Heidi imbued with a deep love of children and childhood. Spyri mentioned that the work was "for children and those who love children". The sequels portray Heidi in a different manner, as she grows up and gets married.
 Heidi in the first book, Heidi, is described as having "short, black curly hair", when she is around five to eight years of age. In Heidi Grows Up, when she is fourteen, her hair is long, straight and fair.
 In some English editions of Heidi the names of the goats are translated into English (Little Swan and Little Bear), while other editions use their original Swiss-German names, Schwanli and Baerli. In Heidi Grows Up only the names Schwanli and Baerli are used.

Film 
In 1990, screenwriters Weaver Webb and Fred & Mark Brogger, and director Christopher Leitch, produced Courage Mountain, starring Charlie Sheen and Juliette Caton as Heidi. Billed as a sequel to Spyri's story, the film is anachronistic in that it depicts Heidi as a teenager during World War I, despite the fact that the original novel (where Heidi is only five years old) was published in 1881.

Basis for Heidi
In April 2010, a Swiss professorial candidate, Peter Buettner, uncovered a book written in 1830 by the German author Hermann Adam von Kamp. The 1830 story is titled "Adelaide: The Girl from the Alps" (German: Adelaide, das Mädchen vom Alpengebirge). The two stories share many similarities in plot line and imagery. Spyri biographer Regine Schindler said it was entirely possible that Spyri may have been familiar with the story as she grew up in a literate household with many books.

Reception

The book has been criticised, even in its day, for its religiously conservative positions, and later for black-and-white character portrayals and an idealization of pastoral life.

In Japan, since its first Japanese translation in 1906, the book has been influential upon the general, stereotypical image of Switzerland for the Japanese, especially its tourists, many visiting the Heidi's Village park.

See also

 2521 Heidi (an asteroid named after Heidi)
 Alpine people and culture
 Alpine transhumance (the traditional practice of moving grazing herds in the Alps between winter valleys and summer mountain pastures)
 History of the Alps
 Swiss folklore

References

External links

 (illustrated)
 (in German)
 
 Heidi (in English) free downloads in multiple ebook formats
 Heidi's Land, The official Web site (in French) for the 1980s television show with Katia Polletin (Heidi) and Stefan Arpagaus (Peter)
 Remembering Heidi: Swiss Pride at its best, by Dr. Anton Anderssen
 Swiss Heidi may in fact be German 
 Johanna Spyri's stolen Alps story?(in German)

Heidi books
1881 German-language novels
1880s children's books
Books about women
Maienfeld
Swiss novels adapted into television shows
Swiss novels adapted into films
Swiss novels adapted into plays
Alps in fiction
Frankfurt in fiction
Novels set in Germany
Novels set in Switzerland
Literary characters introduced in 1881
Characters in novels of the 19th century